Machapuchare, Machhapuchchhre or Machhapuchhre (Tamu: कतासुँ क्लिको), is a mountain situated in the Annapurna massif of Gandaki Province, north-central Nepal. Its highest peak has never been officially climbed due to the impossibility of gaining a permit from the government of Nepal.

Location
Machapuchare is at the end of a long spur ridge, coming south out of the main backbone of the Annapurna massif, which forms the eastern boundary of the Annapurna Sanctuary. The sanctuary is a favorite trekking destination, and the site of the base camps for the South Face of Annapurna and for numerous smaller objectives. The Mardi Himal trek, for instance, climbs towards a minor peak.

Notable features
Due to its southern position in the range and the particularly low terrain that lies south of the Annapurna Himalayas, which contains three of the 10 highest peaks in the world, Machapuchare commands tremendous vertical relief in a short horizontal distance. This, combined with its steep, pointed profile, makes it a particularly striking peak, despite a lower elevation than some of its neighbors. Its double summit resembles the tail of a fish, hence the name meaning "fish's tail" in Nepalese. It is also nicknamed the "Matterhorn of Nepal".

It is a sacred peak for the Gurungs and the people of Chomrong. The mountain is said to be sacred as a home to the god Shiva.

Climbing history

It is believed that Machapuchare has never been climbed to its summit. The only confirmed attempt was in 1957 by a British team led by Lieutenant Colonel Jimmy Roberts. Adhering to the word of honor given to the then King Mahendra, Noyce and his team descended without stepping on to the summit, and published the only climbing record of the mountain a year later. No permits to climb the mountain have been issued since then.

There have been reports of a New Zealand climber, Bill Denz, making a successful yet illegal attempt to the summit in the early 1980s.

Sources

References

External links

 Machapuchare on Summitpost
  The world's 19 most staggeringly beautiful mountains The Telegraph, April 2018.

Sacred mountains
Six-thousanders of the Himalayas
Mountains of the Gandaki Province
Sacred mountains of Nepal